Hockham is a civil parish in the English county of Norfolk.
2001 census.
For the purposes of local government, it falls within the district of Breckland. The district's 2007/08 estimate suggests that the population had risen to 645. At the 2011 Census the population was measured at 603 only in 259 households.

The parish is sometimes referred to as Great Hockham, the main village, though there is evidence that suggests that the village of Little Hockham is now deserted.

Notes

External links

Breckland District
Villages in Norfolk
Civil parishes in Norfolk